Soul Mates is a surviving 1925 American silent drama film directed by Jack Conway, based on the 1911 novel The Reason Why by Elinor Glyn. The movie was the second successful collaboration between Glyn and Conway.

The film's sets were designed by the art director James Basevi.

Plot
Velma is a good little rich girl whose indomitable uncle orders her to wed Lord Tancred, a man she has never met. The same day, she becomes infatuated by a man she meets on the street, not knowing that it is Lord Tancred. When she finds out about his true identity, she becomes convinced he wants to marry her for monetary reasons. She feels betrayed and refuses to speak to him, until she makes an unusual discovery.

Cast
 Aileen Pringle as Velma
 Edmund Lowe as Lord Tancred
 Phillips Smalley as Markrute
 Tony D'Algy as Velma's brother
 Edythe Chapman as Tancred's mother
 Mary Hawes as Velma's maid
 Catherine Bennett as Dolly
 Lucien Littlefield as Stevens
 Ned Sparks as Tancred's chauffeur

Preservation status
Soul Mates was saved by MGM with a preservation print, probably located at the George Eastman House.

References

External links

Still at silenthollywood.com

1925 films
Films based on British novels
Films directed by Jack Conway
Silent American drama films
American silent feature films
1925 drama films
American black-and-white films
Metro-Goldwyn-Mayer films
1920s American films